Argentine Nation to the Valour in Combat Medal (Spanish: Medalla "La Nación Argentina al Valor en Combate") is the second highest military decoration given by the President of Argentina.

The decoration consists of a bronze circular medal bearing the Coat of arms of Argentina surrounded by the legends "La Nación Argentina" (top) and "al Valor en Combate" (bottom), suspended from a chest ribbon of equal light blue-white-light blue stripes.

Recipients of the Medal for service during the 1982 Falklands War are listed below.

Posthumous

Argentine Army
13 decorated members
First Lieutenant Ruben Eduardo Marquez 602 Commando Company
First Lieutenant Roberto Mario Fiorito 601 Assault Helicopter Battalion
First Lieutenant Juan Carlos Buschiazo 601 Assault Helicopter Battalion
Sub-Lieutenant Juan Domingo Baldini 7th Infantry Regiment
Sub-Lieutenant Oscar Augusto Silva  4th Infantry Regiment
First Sergeant Oscar Humberto Blas 602 Commando Company
Sergeant Sergio Ismael García 25th Infantry Regiment (Argentina)
Sergeant Raúl Dimotta 601 Combat Aviation Battalion
First Corporal Dario Rolando Ríos  7th Infantry Regiment
Corporal Mario Rodolfo Castro 25th Infantry Regiment (Argentina)
Private 63 Class Fabricio Edgar Carrascull  25th Infantry Regiment (Argentina)
Private 63 Class Roque Evaristo Sanchez 12th Regiment
Private 63 Class Avelino Nestor Oscar Pegoraro 12th Regiment

Argentine Air Force
Comodore Gustavo Enrique Aguirre Faget 
Vice Comodore Jorge Nelson Barrionuevo
Major Jose Ernesto Basilio 
Captain Jose Leonidas Ardiles 
Captain Jorge Humberto Bacchiddu
First Lieutenant Juan Jose Arraras (A4 Skyhawk Pilot)
Suboficial Mayor Guillermo Mario Aguirre
Suboficial Mayor Jose Antonio Alvarez 
Suboficial Mayor Mario Nestor Amengual
Suboficial Principal Manuel Alberto Albelos 
Suboficial Principal Oscar Antonio Ardizzoni
Suboficial Principal Pedro Cesar Bazan
Suboficial Auxiliar Roberto Osvaldo Alonso 
Cabo Hector Walter Aguirre

During Lifetime

Argentine Army
40 decorated members 
Lieutenant Colonel CARLOS ALBERTO QUEVEDO GA Aerot 4
Major OSCAR RAMON JAIMET  Rl Mec 6
Major MARIO LUIS CASTAGNETO  601 Commando Company
Major GUILLERMO RUBEN BERAZAY   Rl Mec 3
Captain RODRIGO ALEJANDRO SOLOAGA  Esc ExpI C Bl 10
Captain JORGE RODOLFO SVENDSEN  601 Assault Helicopter Battalion
First Lieutenant JORGE AGUSTIN ECHEVERRIA
First Lieutenant CARLOS DANIEL ESTEBAN    25th Infantry Regiment
First Lieutenant HORACIO FERNANDO LAURIA
First Lieutenant JULIO CESAR  NAVONE GA 3
First Lieutenant CARLOS ALBERTO CHANAMPA    GA Aerot 4
First Lieutenant HUGO ALBERTO PEREZ COMETO  601 Combat Aviation Battalion
First Lieutenant ALEJANDO ESTEBAN VILLAGRA
First Lieutenant EDUARDO ERNESTO LOPEZ LEGUIZAMON
Lieutenant RAMON GALINDEZ MATIENZO  Rl Mec 7
Lieutenant RAUL CASTAÑEDA  Rl Mec 7
Sub-Lieutenant OSCAR ROBERTO REYES  RI 25
Sub-Lieutenant ERNESTO PELUFFO   RI 12
Sub-Lieutenant MARCELO ALBERTO LLAMBIAS PRAVAZ  RI 4
First Sergeant JUAN CARLOS COHELO  RI 12
First Sergeant JOSE RIVAS
First Sergeant ROLANDO SPIZUOCCO RI Mec 7
Sergeant JOSE MARIA GONZALEZ FERNANDEZ
Sergeant MIGUEL ALFREDO MORENO
First Corporal MANUEL ADAN MEDINA Rl Mec 7
First Corporal LUIS DORO
First Corporal VICENTE BACA
First Corporal EDUARDO ANIBAL RAMON CRAVERO
First Corporal MARTIN HECTOR SAN MIGUEL
Corporal HUGO OSMAR GODOY
Corporal MARIO MARVIL PACHECO
Corporal GENARO BORDON
Private 62 class LUCIANO OSCAR PINTOS RI Mec 12
Private 62 class OSCAR WULDRICH
Private 62 class EDUARDO GONZALEZ RI 4
Private 62 class PEDRO CELESTINO ARRUA
Private 62 class HECTOR OMAR REINALDI
Private 62 class PEDRO RAMON SAUCEDO
Private 62 class RODOLFO SULIN
Private LEONARDO RONDI RI Mec 6

Argentine Navy
6 decorated members 
Capitán de Fragata CARLOS HUGO ROBACIO 5th Marine Infantry Battalion
Capitán de Corbeta ALOIS ESTEBAN PAYAROLA
Teniente de Fragata DIEGO GARCIA QUIROGA (Agrupación de Buzos Tácticos)
Cabo Principal FRANCISCO SOLANO PAEZ
Cabo Segundo ERNESTO URBINA Agrupación de Buzos Tácticos
Soldado Conscripto ROMUALDO BAZAN

See also 
Argentine Nation to the Heroic Valour in Combat Cross
List of military decorations

References 

Orders, decorations, and medals of Argentina